The history of high-rise buildings in Columbia, South Carolina began with the construction of the National Loan and Exchange Bank Building in 1903. A decade later, the Palmetto Building was built across the street, becoming the tallest in the state. During the 1970s and 80s, Columbia experienced a building boom, which brought economic growth to the region, including several of the city's tallest buildings.

The following table shows the fifteen tallest buildings in Columbia, South Carolina.

Tallest buildings

References

Tallest skyscrapers in Columbia, South Carolina

Buildings and structures in Columbia, South Carolina
Columbia
Tallest in Columbia